King Maker II is a 2019 Hong Kong survival reality show on ViuTV as second season of , accepting only male contestants, with members of the boy group Mirror also being contestants. It aired from 30 September to 6 December 2021, with  being the champion, MC Cheung being the first runner-up, and  being the second runner-up.

References

External links
King Maker II 

2010s Hong Kong television series
2019 in Hong Kong television
Cantonese-language television shows
Reality music competition television series